Raphidocelis subcapitata, formerly known as Selenastrum capricornutum and Pseudokirchneriella subcapitata is a microalga. This microalga presents a curved and twisted appearance like a sickle. The cells are normally presented in a solitary form. It has a length between 8 and 14 μm, and a width between 2 and 3 μm. It is commonly used as a bioindicator species to assess the levels of nutrients or toxic substances in freshwater environments. This species is quite sensitive to the presence of toxic substances including metals and has a ubiquitous distribution, so is broadly used in ecotoxicology. This species has been found to be more competitive than Chara vulgaris at low sodium chloride concentrations, but C. vulgaris was more competitive under salt stress.

References

Sphaeropleales